Kosovo competed at the 2019 Summer Universiade in Naples, Italy from 3 to 14 July 2019. It marked Kosovo's debut appearance at the Universiade.

Competitors
Kosovo was represented by one competitor, Rita Hajdini, who competed in the woman's 400m and 800m.

See also
Kosovo at the Universiade
Kosovo University Sports Federation

References

External links 

 Official site of Naples 2019 

Nations at the 2019 Summer Universiade
Summer U
Kosovo at the Summer Universiade